Shewanella chilikensis is a Gram-negative, rod-shaped, facultatively anaerobic and motile bacterium from the genus of Shewanella which has been isolated from sediments from the Chilika Lagoon in India and marine sponges of Saint Martin's Island of the Bay of Bengal, Bangladesh. Shewanella chilikensis are highly salt tolerant and commonly found in marine environment.

Biochemical characteristics of Shewanella chilikensis 
Colony, morphological, physiological, and biochemical characteristics of Shewanella chilikensis are shown in the Table below.

Note: + = Positive; – =Negative

References

External links
Type strain of Shewanella chilikensis at BacDive -  the Bacterial Diversity Metadatabase

Alteromonadales
Bacteria described in 2009